Norbert Dumont was a Luxembourgish politician and jurist.  Dumont held office in the governments of Pierre Prüm (1925–1926) and Joseph Bech (1926–1936).

|-

Ministers for Justice of Luxembourg
Ministers for Public Works of Luxembourg
Members of the Council of State of Luxembourg
Members of the Chamber of Deputies (Luxembourg)
Liberal League (Luxembourg) politicians
Radical Liberal Party (Luxembourg) politicians
Luxembourgian politicians
Luxembourgian jurists
1883 births
1956 deaths